Budafok-Tétény the 22nd district of Budapest, Hungary.

List of mayors

Twin towns - twin cities
  Bonn – Germany
  Baraolt – Romania
  Kristianstad – Sweden
  Biaoleka (Varsaw) – Poland
  Bolzano – Italy
  Varna – Bulgaria
  Donaustadt (Wien) – Austria
  Ixelles – Belgium
  Koprivnica-Križevci County – Croatia
  Koson (village) – Ukraine
  Seda – Lithuania
  Valencia – Spain

References

External links